Richard Schlesinger may refer to:

Richard Schlesinger (handballer) (born 1946), American former handball player who competed in the 1972 Summer Olympics
Richard Schlesinger (tennis) (1900–?), Australian tennis player
Richard Schlesinger (journalist), American correspondent for 48 Hours